Amadou Ba (born 15 February 1998) is a French professional footballer who plays as a forward for UR La Louvière.

Career
After playing for Le Havre II, Ba signed for English club Southend United in August 2017. He signed on loan for Dartford in September 2018.

He was released by Southend at the end of the 2018–19 season.

Career statistics

References

1998 births
Living people
French footballers
French expatriate footballers
Association football forwards
Le Havre AC players
Southend United F.C. players
Dartford F.C. players
Football Club 93 Bobigny-Bagnolet-Gagny players
UR La Louvière Centre players
Championnat National players
English Football League players
French expatriate sportspeople in England
French expatriate sportspeople in Belgium
Expatriate footballers in England
Expatriate footballers in Belgium